Veerateeswarar temple may refer to several Shiva temples in Tamil Nadu, India:
Veerateeswarar temple, Thiruvathigai, Cuddalore district
Veerateeswarar temple, Korukkai, Mayiladuthurai district
Amritaghateswarar-Abirami Temple, Thirukkadaiyur, Mayiladuthurai district
Veerateeswarar temple, Thirupariyalur, Keelaparasalur, Mayiladuthurai district
Veerateeswarar temple, Thiruvirkudi, Mayiladuthurai district
Veerateeswarar temple, Vazhuvur, Mayiladuthurai district
Kandeeswarar Temple, Kandiyur, Thanjavur district
Veerateeswarar temple, Thirukovilur, Tiruvannamalai district